Merl is both a surname and a given name. Notable people with the name include:

Surname:
 Monika Merl (born 1979), German athlete
 Noah Merl (born 1983), American soccer player
 Volkert Merl (born 1944), German racing driver

Given name:
 Merl Reagle (1950–2015), American crossword constructor
 Merl Saunders (1934–2008), American keyboardist